Will Boyd can refer to:

Will Boyd (musician) (born 1979), American bass guitarist for the band Evanescence
Will Boyd (politician), a candidate in the 2022 United States Senate election in Alabama

See also
William Boyd (disambiguation)